The men's team all-around event was part of the gymnastics programme at the 1924 Summer Olympics. It was one of nine gymnastics events and it was contested for the fifth time. The competition was held from Thursday, July 17, 1924, to Wednesday, July 23, 1924.

Seventy-two gymnasts from nine nations competed.

Results

References
Official Olympic Report
 

All-round team